Patome is a database of biological sequence data of issued patents and/or published applications.

See also
 Patents
 Gene patent

References

External links
 https://web.archive.org/web/20101223004907/http://www.patome.org/

Biological databases
Genetics
Biological patent law
Science and law